The 4th Wisconsin Infantry Regiment was an infantry regiment that served in the Union Army during the American Civil War, primarily in the Western Theater. It was later mounted and became the 4th Wisconsin Cavalry Regiment.

History
The 4th Wisconsin was raised as an infantry regiment at Camp Utley in Racine and was mustered into Federal service on July 2, 1861. It was first assigned to garrison duty in Maryland, then in February 1862 was transferred to Newport News, Virginia. It became part of the Army of the Gulf and was subsequently sent to New Orleans, Louisiana. During the following year, the 4th Wisconsin participated in several expeditions against Vicksburg, Mississippi, and Port Hudson, Louisiana. It saw action in the Siege of Port Hudson from May to July 1863.

On September 1, 1863, the regiment was reorganized as the 4th Wisconsin Cavalry Regiment, which it served as through the remainder of the war.

Total enlistments and casualties
The 4th Wisconsin Regiment initially mustered 1,058 men and later recruited an additional 994 men, for a total of 2,052 men during its service.  The regiment lost 9 officers and 158 enlisted men killed in action or mortally wounds, plus another 2 officers and 113 enlisted men who died of disease, for a total of 282 fatalities.

Commanders
 Colonel Halbert E. Paine (May 27, 1861March 13, 1863) was promoted to brigadier general.
 Colonel Sidney A. Bean (March 17, 1863May 29, 1863) was killed in action at the Battle of Port Hudson.
 Colonel Frederick A. Boardman (June 3, 1863May 3, 1864) was killed in action at Comite River, Louisiana.
 Colonel Joseph Bailey (June 1863) was designated colonel of the regiment by General Nathaniel P. Banks, but the promotion was deemed illegal.  Bailey later served on Banks' staff, was promoted to brigadier general, and received an honorary brevet to major general.

Notable people

 A. Constantine Barry was chaplain of the regiment.  Before the war he had served as Superintendent of Public Instruction of Wisconsin.  He would later serve as a Wisconsin state legislator.
 William D. Hoard, musician, received a medical discharge but later returned to the service in the 1st New York Artillery Regiment.  After the war, he was elected the 16th governor of Wisconsin.
 Harrison Carroll Hobart was captain of Co. K but left the regiment in July 1862 to join the 21st Wisconsin Infantry Regiment, where he was promoted to colonel and later received an honorary brevet to brigadier general.  After the war he was an unsuccessful candidate for governor of Wisconsin in 1865.  Earlier in life, he had been a Wisconsin state legislator and had been speaker of the Wisconsin State Assembly.
 Oscar Hugh La Grange was briefly captain of Co. B, but was transferred to the 1st Wisconsin Cavalry Regiment in November 1861, where he rose to become colonel and received an honorary brevet to brigadier general. 
 Knute Nelson was a corporal in Co. B and was wounded and captured at the Siege of Port Hudson.  Later in life, he became the 12th governor of Minnesota and a four-term United States Senator.
 Otto Puhlman was a sergeant in Co. C, but transferred to the 19th Wisconsin Infantry Regiment in February 1862, and eventually rose to the rank of captain.  After the war, he served in the Wisconsin Legislature and was the first mayor of Plymouth, Wisconsin.
 Wilbur M. Root was enlisted in Co. C.  After the war became a Wisconsin state legislator, police chief, and sheriff.

See also
 List of Wisconsin Civil War units
 Wisconsin in the American Civil War
 4th Wisconsin Infantry Regiment (1898)

References

External links
 4th Wisconsin Volunteers
 The Civil War Archive
 History of the Fourth Wisconsin

Further reading
 Martin, Michael, A History of the 4th Wisconsin Infantry and Cavalry in the American Civil War. Savas-Beatie, 2006. .

Military units and formations established in 1861
Military units and formations disestablished in 1865
Units and formations of the Union Army from Wisconsin
1861 establishments in Wisconsin
1865 disestablishments in Wisconsin